Rocroithys perissus is a species of sea snail, a marine gastropod mollusk in the family Raphitomidae.

Description
The length of the shell attains 22.4 mm.

Distribution
This marine species occurs off New Caledonia.

References

External links
 MNHN, Paris: holotype
 

perissus
Gastropods described in 2001